"Stuck on Your Love" is a song recorded by Canadian country music artist Duane Steele. It was released in 1996 as the first single from his debut album, P.O. Box 423. It peaked at number 2 on the RPM Country Tracks chart in March 1996.

Chart performance

Year-end charts

References

1996 songs
1996 singles
Duane Steele songs
Mercury Records singles
Songs written by Rick Giles
Songs written by Steve Bogard